Proisotoma is a genus of elongate-bodied springtails in the family Isotomidae. There are at least 50 described species in Proisotoma.

Species
These 50 species belong to the genus Proisotoma:

 Proisotoma aera Christiansen & Bellinger, 1980
 Proisotoma alpa Christiansen & Bellinger, 1980
 Proisotoma ananevae Babenko & Bulavintsev, 1993
 Proisotoma anopolitana Schulz & Lymberakis, 2006
 Proisotoma antigua (Folsom, 1937)
 Proisotoma bayouensis Mills, 1931
 Proisotoma beta Christiansen & Bellinger, 1980
 Proisotoma buddenrocki Stenkzke, 1954
 Proisotoma bulba Christiansen & Bellinger, 1980
 Proisotoma bulbosa Folsom, 1937
 Proisotoma clavipila Axelson, 1903
 Proisotoma coeca da Gama, 1961
 Proisotoma communis Sánchez-García & Engel, 2016
 Proisotoma crassicauda (Tullberg, 1871)
 Proisotoma dualis
 Proisotoma dubia Christiansen & Bellinger, 1980
 Proisotoma ewingi James, 1933
 Proisotoma excavata Folsom, 1937
 Proisotoma extra Christiansen & Bellinger, 1980
 Proisotoma frisoni Folson, 1937
 Proisotoma fungi Selga, 1962
 Proisotoma immersa (Folsom, 1937)
 Proisotoma juaniae Lucianez & Simon, 1992
 Proisotoma laticauda Folsom, 1937
 Proisotoma libra Christiansen & Bellinger, 1980
 Proisotoma longispina MacGillivray
 Proisotoma macgillivaryi (Della Torre, 1895)
 Proisotoma mackenziana Hammar, 1952
 Proisotoma minima (Absolon, 1901)
 Proisotoma minuta (Tullberg, 1871)
 Proisotoma muskegis (Guthrie, 1903)
 Proisotoma najtae Selga, 1971
 Proisotoma nova Palissa, 1969
 Proisotoma obsoleta (Macgillivray, 1896)
 Proisotoma papillosa Stach, 1947
 Proisotoma rainieri Folsom, 1937
 Proisotoma ramosi Arle, 1959
 Proisotoma ripicola Linnaniemi, 1912
 Proisotoma schoetti (Dalla Torre, 1895)
 Proisotoma sepulchralis (Folsom, 1902)
 Proisotoma subminuta Denis, 1931
 Proisotoma tenella (Reuter, 1895)
 Proisotoma titusi Folsom, 1937
 Proisotoma turberculatum Stach, 1947
 Proisotoma veca (Wray, 1952)
 Proisotoma vernoga (Wray, 1958)
 Proisotoma vesiculata Folsom, 1937
 Proisotoma vetusta (Folson, 1937)
 Proisotoma woodi Christiansen & Bellinger, 1980
 † Proisotoma pettersonae Christiansen & Nascimbene, 2006

References

Further reading

External links

 

Collembola
Articles created by Qbugbot
Springtail genera